Wayne Harold Osborne (October 11, 1912 – March 13, 1987) was an American professional baseball pitcher, who played in Major League Baseball (MLB) for the Pittsburgh Pirates (1935) and Boston Bees (1936). He batted left-handed and threw right-handed.

Osborne was born in Watsonville, California, and went straight from high school onto the Portland Beavers in 1931 and the Mission Reds from 1932–34.

In Osborne's two-season major league pitching career, his statistical accomplishments include posting a 1–1 win–loss record, with nine strikeouts, and a 5.91 earned run average (ERA), in  innings pitched.

On February 7, 1942, Osborne signed an agreement to be an extra in the movie The Pride of The Yankees for the rate of $52.50 per week.

After retiring from baseball, Osborne went into radio broadcasting in the Chicago area, calling Chicago Cubs games with Bert Wilson in 1945 and later serving as chief announcer for station WOPA.

On March 13, 1987, Osborne died in Vancouver, Washington, at the age of 74.

References

External links

1912 births
1987 deaths
Baseball players from California
Boston Bees players
Chicago Cubs announcers
Major League Baseball pitchers
Mission Reds players
People from Watsonville, California
Pittsburgh Pirates players
Portland Beavers players